Breakfast on the Grass is a 1987 Estonian animated film directed by Priit Pärn.

Plot

Cast

Awards
 1988: Tampere Film Festival (Finland), Grand Prix
 1988: ANIMAFEST ZAGREB - World Festival of Animated Film (Croatia), Grand Prix; Best Film in category C; Critics’ Prize
 1988: CINANIMA - International Animated Film Festival (Espinho, Portugal), Grand Prix

References

External links
 
 Breakfast on the Grass, entry in Estonian Film Database (EFIS)

1987 films
Estonian animated films